A Christian state is a country that recognizes a form of Christianity as its official religion and often has a state church (also called an established church), which is a Christian denomination that supports the government and is supported by the government.

Historically, the nations of Aksum, Armenia, Makuria, Holy Roman Empire, as well as the Roman Empire and its continuation, the Byzantine Empire declared themselves as Christian states.

Today, several nations officially identify themselves as Christian states or have state churches. These countries include Argentina, Armenia, Costa Rica, El Salvador, Denmark (incl. Greenland and the Faroes), England, Georgia, Greece, Hungary, Iceland, Liechtenstein, Malta, Monaco, Norway, Samoa, Serbia, Tonga, Tuvalu, Vatican City, and Zambia. A Christian state stands in contrast to a secular state, an atheist state, or another religious state, such as a Jewish state, or an Islamic state.

History 
The Armenian Orthodox church puts its founding at 301, with the conversion of Tiridates and declaration of Christianity as the official state religion, although the date is disputed. In 380, three Roman emperors issued the Edict of Thessalonica (Cunctos populos), making the Roman Empire a Christian state, and establishing Nicene Christianity, in the form of its State Church, as its official religion.

After the fall of the Western Roman Empire in the late 5th century, the Eastern Roman Empire under the emperor Justinian (reigned 527–565),  became the world's predominant Christian state, based on Roman law, Greek culture, and the Greek language." In this Christian state, in which nearly all of its subjects upheld faith in Jesus, an "enormous amount of artistic talent was poured into the construction of churches, church ceremonies, and church decoration". John Binns describes this era, writing that:

As a Christian state, Armenia "embraced Christianity as the religion of the King, the nobles, and the people". In 326, according to official tradition of the Georgian Orthodox Church, following the conversion of Mirian and Nana, the country of Georgia became a Christian state, the Emperor Constantine the Great sending clerics for baptising people. In the 4th century, in the Kingdom of Aksum, after Ezana's conversion to the faith, this empire also became a Christian state.

In the Middle Ages, efforts were made in order to establish a Pan-Christianity state by uniting the countries within Christendom. Christian nationalism played a role in this era in which Christians felt the impulse to also recover those territories in which Christianity historically flourished, such as the Holy Land and North Africa.

The First Great Awakening, American Revolution, and Second Great Awakening caused two rounds of disestablishment among the states of the new United States, from 1776 to 1833.

Modern era

Argentina 
Article 2 of the Constitution of Argentina explicitly states that "the Federal Government supports the Roman Catholic Apostolic Faith" and Article 14 guarantees freedom of religion. Although it enforces neither an official nor a state faith, it gives Catholic Christianity a preferential status. Before its 1994 amendment, the Constitution stated that the President of the Republic must be a Roman Catholic.

Armenia 
In Armenia Christianity is the state religion and the Armenian Apostolic Church is the national church. Armenia is the earliest Christian state.

Costa Rica 
The constitution of Costa Rica states that "The Catholic and Apostolic Religion is the religion of the State". As such, Catholic Christian holy days are recognized by the government and "public schools provide religious education", although parents are able to opt-out their children if they choose to do so.

Denmark

As early as the 11th century AD, "Denmark was considered to be a Christian state", with the Church of Denmark, a member of the Lutheran World Federation, being the state church. Prof. Wasif Shadid, of Leiden University, writes that:

82.1% of the population of Denmark are members of the Lutheran Church of Denmark, which is "officially headed by the queen of Denmark". Furthermore, clergy "in the Church of Denmark are civil servants employed by the Ministry of Ecclesiastical Affairs" and the "economic base of the Church of Denmark is state-collected church taxes combined with a direct state subsidiary (12%), which symbolically covers the expenses of the Church of Denmark to run the civil registration and the burial system for all citizens."

England

Barbara Yorke writes that the "Carolingian Renaissance heightened appreciation within England of the role of king and church in a Christian state." As such, 

Christian religious education is taught to children in primary and secondary schools in the United Kingdom. English schools have a legal requirement for a daily act of collective worship "of a broadly Christian character" that is widely flouted.

Faroe Islands
The Church of the Faroe Islands is the state church of Faroe Islands.

Georgia
Georgia is one of the oldest Christian states. Article 8 of Georgian Constitution and the Concordat of 2002 grants the Georgian Orthodox Church special privileges, which include legal immunity to the Patriarch of Georgia. The Orthodox Church is the most trusted institution in the country and its head, Patriarch Ilia II, the most trusted person.

Greece
Greece is a Christian state, with the Greek Orthodox Church playing "a dominant role in the life of the country".

Greenland
Being an autonomous constituent country within the Kingdom of Denmark, the Church of Denmark is the established church of Greenland through the Constitution of Denmark:

This applies to all of the Kingdom of Denmark, except for the Faroe Islands, as the Church of the Faroe Islands became independent in 2007.

Hungary
The preamble to the Hungarian Constitution of 2011 describes Hungary as "part of Christian Europe" and acknowledges "the role of Christianity in preserving nationhood", while Article VII provides that "the State shall cooperate with the Churches for community goals". However, the constitution also guarantees freedom of religion and separation of church and state.

Iceland
 
Around AD 1000, Iceland became a Christian state. The Encyclopedia of Protestantism states that:

All public schools have mandatory education in Christianity, although an exemption may be considered by the Minister of Education.

Liechtenstein
Liechtenstein's constitution designates the Catholic Church as being the state Church of that country. In public schools, per article 16 of the Constitution of Liechtenstein, religious education is given by Church authorities.

Malta

Section Two of the Constitution of Malta specifies the state's religion as being the Roman Catholic Apostolic Religion. It holds that the "authorities of the Roman Catholic Apostolic Church have the duty to teach which principles are right and which are wrong" and that "religious teaching of the Roman Catholic Apostolic Faith shall be provided in all State schools as part of compulsory education".

Monaco
Article 9 of the Constitution of Monaco describes " [the catholic, apostolic and Roman religion]" as the religion of the state.

Norway

Church and state were formally separated in 2017 after a change to the constitution in 2012. A timeline for the relationship between church and state is provided on the Norwegian Government's official website.

Cole Durham and Tore Sam Lindholm, writing in 2013, stated that "For a period of one thousand years Norway has been a kingdom with a Christian state church" and that a decree went out in 1739 ordering that "Elementary schooling for all Norwegian children became mandatory, so that all Norwegians should be able to read the Bible and the Lutheran Catechism firsthand." The modern Constitution of Norway stipulates that "The Church of Norway, an Evangelical-Lutheran church, will remain the Established Church of Norway and will as such be supported by the State." As such, the "Norwegian constitution decrees that Lutheranism is the official religion of the State and that the King is the supreme temporal head of the Church." The administration of the Church "is shared between the Ministry for Church, Education and Research centrally and municipal authorities locally", and the Church of Norway "depends on state and local taxes". The Church of Norway is responsible for the "maintenance of church buildings and cemeteries". In the mid-20th century, the vast majority of Norwegians participated in the Lutheran Church. According to a 1957 description,  "[o]ver 90 percent of the population are married by state church clergymen, have their children baptized and confirmed, and finally are buried with a church service." However, current membership in the Evangelical Lutheran Church of Norway is much lower, standing at 65% of the population in 2021.

Samoa
Samoa became a Christian state in 2017. Article 1 of the Samoan Constitution states that “Samoa is a Christian nation founded of God the Father, the Son and the Holy Spirit”.

Serbia

Serbia as a territory became a Christian state during the time of Constantine the Great in Christianization of Eastern Roman Empire, according to the research and discoveries of artifacts left by the Illyrians, Triballi and other kindred tribes. More research has since been made that perhaps prove the existence of Serbs living in the Balkans during Roman times in Ilyria. In the centuries that followed from the fourth- to the 12th-century, when Catholic Church was in a battleground between Serbia due the Eastern Orthodox Church, Serbia prevailed as Orthodox Christian state under his jurisdiction through Saint Sava.

Serbia as modern state, defines in his constitution as a secular state with guaranteed religious freedom. However, orthodox Christians with 6,079,396 comprise 84.5% of country's population. The Serbian Orthodox Church is the largest and traditional church of the country, adherents of which are overwhelmingly Serbs. And the church directly or indirectly has both cultural influence on the decisions and positions of the state.

Tonga
Tonga became a Christian state under George Tupou I in the 19th century, with the Free Wesleyan Church, a member of the World Methodist Council, being established as the country's state Church. Under the rule of George Tupou I, there was established a "rigorous constitutional clause regulating observation of the Sabbath".

Tuvalu
The Church of Tuvalu, a Calvinist church in the Congregationalist tradition, is the state church of Tuvalu and was established as such in 1991. The Constitution of Tuvalu identifies Tuvalu as "an independent State based on Christian principles".

Vatican City

Vatican City is a Christian state, in which the "Pope is ex officio simultaneously leader of the Catholic Church as well as Head of State and Head of the Government of the State of the Vatican City; he also possesses absolute authority over the legislative, executive and judicial branches."

Zambia
Jeroen Temperman, a professor of international law at Erasmus University Rotterdam writes that:

After "Zambia declared itself a Christian nation in 1991", "the nation's vice president urged citizens to 'have a Christian orientation in all fields, at all levels'."

Established churches and former state churches

National church

A number of countries have a national church which is not established (as the official religion of the nation), but is nonetheless recognised under civil law as being the country's acknowledged religious denomination. Whilst these are not Christian states, the official Christian national church is likely to have certain residual state functions in relation to state occasions and ceremonial. Examples include Scotland (Church of Scotland) and Sweden (Church of Sweden). A national church typically has a monopoly on official state recognition, although unusually Finland has two national churches (the Evangelical Lutheran Church of Finland and the Finnish Orthodox Church), both recognised under civil law as joint official churches of the nation.

See also 

 Antidisestablishmentarianism
 Christian nationalism
 Christian Reconstructionism
 Christian republic
 Civil religion
 History of Christian flags
 Pan-Christianity
Render unto Caesar
 Res publica Christiana
 Separation of church and state
 Theonomy
 Islamic state

Notes

References

Citations

Sources 
 
 
 Legal documents

External links

State churches (Christian)
 
State
State
State
Theocracy
Congregationalism